The following is a timeline of the history of the city of Pittsburgh, Pennsylvania, US.

18th century
 1742
 John Fraser is given what will become Braddock's Field.
 1754 
 January: Construction on Fort Prince George is started
 April 18: Fort Prince George is surrendered.
 April: Fort Duquesne established by French.
 1755 
 July 9: French and Indian forces defeat the British Army.
 1758 
 September 14: The Battle of Fort Duquesne takes place
 November 25: British take Fort Duquesne, rename it Pittsburgh (variously spelled).
 1760 
 Population: 464.
 1763
 June 22: Siege of Fort Pitt begins
 August 20: Siege of Fort Pitt ends
 1764
 The Fort Pitt Blockhouse is completed.
 1768
 November 5: Fort Pitt is annexed into Pennsylvania with the signing of the Treaty of Fort Stanwix.
 1786 
 Gazette newspaper begins publication.
 1787 
 Pittsburgh Academy established.
 1788 
 Allegheny County is created from parts of Westmoreland and Washington counties. Allegheny County Sheriff's Office is established.
 Town of Allegheny is laid out north of Pittsburgh.
 September 17: Treaty of Fort Pitt is signed.
 Mechanical Society organized.
 1792
 Fort Pitt is abandoned by the U.S. Army.
 Fort Lafayette is established.
 1793
 September 12: The Pittsburgh Bureau of Fire is established.
 1794
 Pittsburgh is incorporated as a borough.
 The Pittsburgh Night Watchmen, the predecessor to the Pittsburgh Police Department is established.
 August 1: Rebellious militiamen and farmers march on the city during the Whiskey Rebellion
 1797
 August 3: Fort Pitt is officially decommissioned by the army and is subsequently demolished.  
 1798 
 Gilkison Bookstore and Circulating Library in business.
 1800 
 Population: 1,565.

19th century

1800s-1840s

 1803 
 Fort Lafayette serves as a staging base for the Lewis and Clark Expedition.
 McClurg iron foundry in business.
 1810
 Eagle Fire Company formed.
 Population: 4,768.
 1811 
 Pittsburgh Engine Company in business.
 1812
 Fort Lafayette serves as a supply base for Commodore Oliver Hazard Perry. 
 1813 
 Pittsburgh Humane Society and Chemical and Physiological Society established.
 1815
 Allegheny College is established.
 1814 
 Fort Lafayette is abandoned.
 Pittsburgh Permanent Library Company established.
 1816
 March 18: Pittsburgh borough is incorporated as a city.
 Ebenezer Denny becomes mayor.
 1820 
 Population: 7,248.
 1825 
 Pittsburgh Apprentices' Library founded.
 1828
 Town of Allegheny incorporated as a borough.
 City water pumping system put into effect for the Allegheny River. 
 1829
 City wards created: East, North, South, West.
 Western Division Canal in operation.
 1830 
 Population: 12,542.
 1831 
 Theban Literary Society organized.
 1832 
 African Education Society founded.
 The Flood of 1832.
 Cholera outbreak.
 1833 
 Pittsburg Theater built.
 1835 
 Board of Trade created.
 1838 
 Pittsburg Institute of Arts and Sciences incorporated.
 1840
 Allegheny borough incorporated as a city.
 Pittsburgh and Beaver Canal opens.
 1841
 Courthouse built on Grant Street.
 State Convention of Colored Freemen held in city.
 1842
 Sitdown strike by iron workers.
 1843 
 Roman Catholic Diocese of Pittsburgh established.
 1844 
 Allegheny Cemetery established.
 1845
 April 10: Fire.
 Delany's The Mystery newspaper begins publication.
 1846
 Uptown becomes part of city.
 Pittsburgh Dispatch newspaper begins publication.
 Odeon Hall opens.
 1847 
 Young Men's Mercantile Library & Mechanics Institute established.
 The Catholic Sisters of Mercy establish Mercy Hospital, the first hospital in Pittsburgh
 1849
 St. Mary Cemetery established.
 Horne's in business.
 Manufacture of "Kier's Rock Oil" begins.

1850s–1890s
 1851
 Duff's Mercantile College and German Library Association established.
 St. Peter's Episcopal Church built.
 1852 
 Pennsylvania Railroad begins operating, linking the city with Philadelphia.
 1854  
 Cholera outbreak.
 1856  
 February: An informal National Republican convention is held in the city.
 1857
 The Pittsburgh Police Department is established.
 1859 
 Lawrenceville-Pittsburgh railway begins operating.
 The first Sixth Street Bridge is created by John Roebling.
 1860 – Population: 49,221.
 1861
 Jones and Laughlin Steel Company in business.
 Rodef Shalom Congregation built.
 The Iron City Brewing Company is established.
 1862
 The Allegheny Arsenal explosion.
 1865 
 Pittsburgh and Steubenville Railroad begins operating.
 1868 
 City expands to the east by annexing the borough of Lawrenceville and the townships of Pitt, Oakland, Collins, Liberty, and Peebles.
 1869
 December 11: Pennsylvania Female College founded.
 Westinghouse Air Brake Company in business.
 1870
 May 28: The Monongahela Incline opens
 1872
 South Side becomes part of city.
 Trinity Cathedral built.
 1873 
 Duquesne Club founded.
 1875 
 Edgar Thomson Steel Works in business near city.
 1876
 February 2: The city loses its bid for a professional baseball franchise in the newly established National League.
 February 22: The Allegheny Base Ball Club, a precursor to the modern-day Pittsburgh Pirates, is established.
 Chamber of Commerce established.
 Point Bridge opens.
 1877
 February 20: The International Association for Professional Base Ball Players is founded in Pittsburgh.
 Railroad strike.
 Duquesne Incline funicular begins operating.
 1878
 June 8: The Pittsburgh Allegheny professional baseball club folds.
 Pittsburgh Catholic College of the Holy Ghost opens.
 Homewood Cemetery is established.
 1879 
 Zion's Watch Tower begins publication.
 "Old Residents of Pittsburgh and Western Penna." established.
 1881
 November 15: Federation of Organized Trades and Labor Unions formed at Turner Hall.
 Population: 156,381.
 1882 
 Allegheny baseball team is established and begins play in the American Association.
 Historical Society of Pittsburg and Western Pa. formed.
 1883 
 Smithfield Street Bridge opens.
 1884 
 Evening Penny Press newspaper begins publication.
 August 22: Baseball's Chicago Browns of the Union Association relocate to Pittsburgh and become the Pittsburgh Stogies.
 September 18: The Union Association's Pittsburgh Stogies disband. 
 1885 
 Kaufmann's department store in business.
 The Winter Garden opens
 1886
 September: Racial unrest.
 Westinghouse Electric Company in business.
 Calvary Catholic Cemetery founded.
 The Allegheny County Jail is constructed.
 1887 
 Baseball's Pittsburgh Alleghenys leave the American Association for the National League.
 The Pittsburgh Keystones, a Negro league baseball club, begins play in the League of Colored Baseball Clubs; however, the league and team fold within a week.
 1888
 Pittsburg Reduction Co. (later Alcoa) in business.
 Allegheny County Courthouse rebuilt.
 September: Allegheny County centennial.
 1889
 Schenley Park is created
 1890
 Major League Baseball's Pittsburgh Burghers represent the city in short-lived Players' League.
 The third Exposition Park opens.
 Allegheny Athletic Association fields their American football team.
 September 1: The first triple-header in Major League Baseball history is played between the Brooklyn Bridegrooms and the Pittsburgh Innocents
 October 11: The Pittsburgh Panthers football team plays its first-ever football game.
 Schenley Park established.
 H.J. Heinz Company in business.
 National Slavonic Society headquartered in city.
 Duquesne Traction Company is built as a trolley barn.
 1891 
 The newly created United States Board on Geographic Names adopts "Pittsburg" as its standard spelling of the name of Pittsburgh.
 Dravo shipbuilder in business.
 The National League's Pittsburgh baseball club gains the then-unofficial nickname "Pirates".
 Pittsburgh Athletic Club fields their American football team.
 Duquesne University first fields its American football team.
 1892
 Carnegie Steel Company in business.
 St. Stanislaus Kostka Church built.
 The second Sixth Street Bridge is built by engineer Theodore Cooper for the Union Bridge Company.
 July 6: Homestead Steel Strike takes place.
 Young Women's Christian Association of Pittsburg and Allegheny founded.
 November 12: Pudge Heffelfinger becomes the first professional American football player, as a member of the Allegheny Athletic Association, in a game against the Pittsburgh Athletic Club. 
 1893 
 Children's Home of Pittsburgh established.
 Ben "Sport" Donnelly of the Allegheny Athletic Association becomes the first professional American football coach.
 Grant Dibert of the Pittsburg Athletic Club becomes the first American football player to sign and be kept under to the first known professional football contract.
 1894 
 Fifth Avenue High School built.
 1895 
 Carnegie Museums and Carnegie Library of Pittsburgh founded.
 Pittsburgh Arts Society founded.
 May 29: Schenley Park Casino opens
 September: The Duquesne Country and Athletic Club football team is formed.
 December 30: The very first ice hockey game is played inside the city, held at the Schenley Park Casino.
 1896 
 Carnegie Museum of Natural History is established.
 Homestead Library & Athletic Club is established.
 November 17: The Pittsburgh-based Western Pennsylvania Hockey League began its inaugural season.
 December 17: Schenley Park Casino is destroyed by fire.
 December 18: Western Pennsylvania Hockey League suspends operations for the remainder of the season. No championship is awarded.
 The Duquesne Traction Company is renovated and opens as the Duquesne Gardens.
 1897 
 Immaculate Heart of Mary Church dedicated.
 Station Square first opens as the Pittsburgh & Lake Erie Railroad Complex.
 1898
 William Chase Temple becomes the first-ever owner of an American football team when he takes over the payments of the Duquesne Country and Athletic Club team.
 Pittsburgh & Lake Erie Railroad Station built.
 Pittsburgh Zoo opens on Tuesday, 14 June 1898.
 Kennywood Park opens
 December 3: The Duquesne Country and Athletic Club defeats the Western Pennsylvania All-Stars in the very first all-star game for professional American football.
 The Western Pennsylvania Hockey League is re-established and use the Duquesne Gardens as their venue. The Pittsburgh Athletic Club goes on win the league's first title.
 1899 
 April 4: the Duquesne Brewing Company is established.
 Pittsburgh Brewing Company formed.
 1900 
 March: Pittsburgh Athletic Club wins their second title in the Western Pennsylvania Hockey League.
 Carnegie Technical Schools established.
 The Duquesne Country and Athletic Club football team folds.
 Homestead Library & Athletic Club football team wins the professional American football championship.
 Pittsburgh Bankers ice hockey team is established.
 Population: 321,616.

20th century

1900s-1940s
 1901
 Pittsburgh Athletic Club wins their third title in the Western Pennsylvania Hockey League.
 The Pittsburgh Pirates win their first National League title.
 November 30:  The Homestead Library & Athletic Club football team wins the professional football championship.
 1902
 January 1: The Pittsburgh Railways Company is established.
 Ice hockey's Pittsburgh Victorias are established
 The Pittsburgh Keystones win the Western Pennsylvania Hockey League title.
 Harry Peel, of the Pittsburgh Keystones admits that he was paid $35 a week to play in the Western Pennsylvania Hockey League, becoming one of the first openly professional ice hockey players.
 Pittsburgh Railways Company and Children's Institute of Pittsburgh established.
 Frick Building constructed.
 The Pittsburgh Pirates win their second National League title.
 November 29: The Pittsburg Stars win the first National Football League's championship.
 1903 
 The Pittsburgh Bankers win their first Western Pennsylvania Hockey League title.
 Union Station, Wabash Tunnel, and McCreery's department store open.
 The Pittsburgh Pirates win their third National League title.
 October 1–13: The first modern World Series is played between the Pittsburgh Pirates and the Boston Americans.
 1904
 January 17: The Pittsburgh Keystones withdrew from the Western Pennsylvania Hockey League.
 The Pittsburgh Victorias win the title for the Western Pennsylvania Hockey League.
 Wabash Bridge built.
 Wabash Railroad begins operating.
 July 31: Construction begins on Immaculate Heart of Mary Church
 Gayety Theater opens.
 The Western Pennsylvania Hockey League ceases operations.
 The Pittsburgh Victorias cease operations.
 The Pittsburgh Professionals becomes the city's representative in the International Professional Hockey League.
 1905 
 Nickelodeon opens.
 December 3: Immaculate Heart of Mary Church opens
 1906
 Saint Paul Cathedral built.
 G. C. Murphy variety shop in business.
 1907
 Allegheny becomes part of Pittsburgh.
 Frank & Seder in business.
 The Western Pennsylvania Hockey League is re-established
 The Pittsburgh Lyceum ice hockey team is established.
 December: The first known trade of professional hockey players takes place as the Pittsburgh Lyceum sends Harry Burgoyne to the Pittsburgh Bankers for Dutch Koch.
 1908
 The Pittsburgh Bankers win their second title in the Western Pennsylvania Hockey League.
 Beechview becomes part of city.
 Pittsburgh Athletic Association organized.
 December 23: The Pittsburgh Lyceum ice hockey team folds.
 1909
 February: The Duquesne Athletic Club wins the 1908–09 season title in the Western Pennsylvania Hockey League, as the team and the league formally fold.
 July–September: Pressed Steel Car Strike of 1909.
 Pittsburgh Aero Club founded.
 June 30: Forbes Field opens
 October 16: Pittsburgh Pirates win the 1909 World Series
 1910
 Economic Club of Pittsburgh active.
 Soldiers and Sailors Memorial Hall dedicated.
 May 10: The Pittsburgh Courier begins publication
 1911 
 Pittsburgh Public School District formed.
 The Syria Mosque is constructed
 July 19: the United States Geographic Board adopts "Pittsburgh" as its standard spelling of the city name, reversing its 20-year-old decision favoring  "Pittsburg".
 1912 
 Homestead Grays, a Negro league baseball team is formed.
 The Pittsburgh Filipinos of the United States Baseball League were founded.
 1913
 The  Pittsburgh Filipinos move to the Federal League and become the Pittsburgh Stogies.
 April: Schoolchildren's protest.
 Concordia Club building opens.
 1914 
 Regent Theatre opens.
 Pittsburgh Stogies are renamed Pittsburgh Rebels.
 1915 
 The Pittsburgh Yellow Jackets are founded by Roy Schooley.
 The Pittsburgh Rebels fold with the Federal League.
 National Association for the Advancement of Colored People branch and Pittsburgh Musical Institute established.
 July 5: Construction begins on the Pittsburgh City-County Building.
 The Pittsburgh Panthers football team claim their first national championship.
 1916 
 William Penn Hotel in business.
 The Pittsburgh Winter Garden begins hosting ice skating and ice hockey.
 The Pittsburgh Panthers football team claim their second national championship.
 October 26: The Syria Mosque opens.
 1917 
 Union Trust Building and Pittsburgh City-County Building open.
 December: The Pittsburgh City-County Building is completed.
 1918 
 May 31: Czecho-Slovakia Agreement signed in Moose Hall.
 The Pittsburgh Panthers football team claims its third national championship.
 1920 
 KDKA (AM) radio begins broadcasting.
 October 2: The final triple-header in Major League Baseball history is played at Forbes Field.
 1921 
 Robert Morris University is established.
 The Pittsburgh Keystones, a Negro league baseball team is revised and begins play.
 American football's J.P. Rooneys, the forerunners to the modern-day Pittsburgh Steelers, are established as "Hope-Harvey" by Art Rooney.
 August 8: The first part of the Boulevard of the Allies is dedicated.
 1922 
 The Negro league baseball's Pittsburgh Keystones cease operations.
 1923
 The entire Boulevard of the Allies opened to traffic
 Centre Avenue YMCA opens.
 1924 
 Liberty Tunnel and 40th Street Bridge open.
 1925 
 September 1: Pitt Stadium opens.
 October 15: Pittsburgh Pirates win the 1925 World Series
 Pittsburgh Pirates become the city's first club in the National Hockey League
 1926 
 University of Pittsburgh's Cathedral of Learning built.
 1927
 Frick Park Loew's Penn Theater, and Point Bridge open.
 The Pittsburgh Post-Gazette and Pittsburgh Sun-Telegraph are formed from four pre-existing newspapers.
 Pittsburgh Symphony Society established.
 The Sixth Street Bridge is demolished and rebuilt. 
 Pittsburgh Central Catholic High School opens.
 November 14: Gas explosion.
 1928
 February 27: The Benedum Center opens
 Liberty Bridge opens.
 Josh Gibson Field opens as Ammon Field.
 1929
 Amateur Astronomers Association of Pittsburgh founded.
 Koppers Tower built.
 The Pittsburgh Panthers football team claim their fourth national championship.
 1930 
 Grant Building constructed.
 March 18: Pittsburgh Pirates play their last hockey game.
 July 18: The Homestead Grays and the Kansas City Monarchs play the first night baseball game in the city at Forbes Field.
 The Pittsburgh Yellow Jackets are re-established
 The first Crawford Grill is established.
 1931
 Allegheny County Airport dedicated.
 Federal Reserve Bank of Cleveland Pittsburgh Branch built.
 Pittsburgh Crawfords, a Negro league baseball team is formed.
 The Pittsburgh Panthers football team claim their fifth national championship.
 1932 
 January 13: In college basketball, the City Game is first played between Duquesne Dukes and the Pittsburgh Panthers
 Allegheny County Police Department is established
 Gulf Tower and West End Bridge built.
 April 29: Greenlee Field opens
 1933
 July 8: Pittsburgh Pirates football team is formed from members of the J.P. Rooneys and becomes as a member of the National Football League.
 Primanti Brothers is established in the city's Strip District.
 November 6: Pittsburgh mayoral election, 1933 held.
 South Tenth Street Bridge opens.
 1934 
 United States Post Office and Courthouse built.
 The Pittsburgh Panthers football team claim their sixth national championship.
 1935 
 The Monongahela Incline undergoes electrification.
 May 25: Babe Ruth hits the final three home runs of his career as the Boston Braves lost to the Pirates, 11–7. His last home run cleared the right field stands roofline of Forbes Field, making him the first player to ever do so.
 September 8: The Pittsburgh Shamrocks of the International Hockey League are established
 The Pittsburgh Crawfords win their first Negro National League title
 1936 
 March: Flood.
 The Detroit Olympics move to Pittsburgh becoming the Pittsburgh Hornets of the American Hockey League.
 The  Pittsburgh Americans of the second American Football League is formed.
 The Pittsburgh Crawfords win their second Negro National League title.
 November 3: The  Pittsburgh Shamrocks of the International Hockey League end their operations.
 The Pittsburgh Panthers football team claim their seventh national championship.
 Dapper Dan Charities is founded by Pittsburgh Post-Gazette editor Al Abrams.
 1937 
 Ohio River flood of 1937.
 The Pittsburgh Yellow Jackets fold for the final time.
 October 22: The Pittsburgh Americans football franchise folds
 November 20: The Homestead High-Level Bridge opens.
 The Pittsburgh Panthers football team claim their eighth national championship.
 1938
 The Pittsburgh Crawfords are sold and relocated to Toledo.
 Greenlee Field is demolished.
 1939
 The Dapper Dan Award is established.
 1940 
 American football's Pittsburgh Pirates are renamed the Pittsburgh Steelers.
 1941
 Music Hall of the Winter Garden at Exposition Hall is demolished to secure scrap metal for the war effort during World War II. 
 1942 
 United Steelworkers headquartered in city.
 Machinery Hall of the Winter Garden at Exposition Hall is demolished to secure scrap metal for the war effort during World War II. 
 1943
 August: Due to manning shortages related to World War II, the Pittsburgh Steelers merge with the Philadelphia Eagles for the 1943 NFL season.
 October 5: Homestead Grays win the 1943 Negro World Series baseball contest.
 Crawford Grill number 2, opens on the corner of Wylie Avenue and Elmore Street
 1944 
 Allegheny Conference on Community Development established.
 July 11: The 12th Major League Baseball All-Star Game is held at Forbes Field.
 August 15: Due to manning shortages related to World War II, the Pittsburgh Steelers merge with the Chicago Cardinals for the 1944 NFL season.
 September 24: Homestead Grays win the 1944 Negro World Series baseball contest.
 1945
 Pittsburgh Youth Symphony Orchestra and Pittsburgh Foundation established.
 Arts and Craft Center opens in Shadyside.
 1946
 Power strike.
 The Pittsburgh Ironmen of the Basketball Association of America (a forerunner of the National Basketball Association) begin play.
 Pittsburgh Civic Light Opera established.
 1947
September 9: The Island Queen is destroyed in an explosion, killing 19, while docked in the Monongahela River.
 The Pittsburgh Ironmen cease operations.
 1948
 October 5: Homestead Grays win the 1948 Negro World Series.
 Crawford Grill number 3, located on the corner of Bidwell Street and Pennsylvania Avenue, is established.

1950s-1990s
 1950 
 Population: 676,806.
 1951 
 July 2: The Main Hall of the Winter Garden at Exposition Hall is demolished.
 The first Crawford Grill is destroyed in a fire.
 December 15: The Fitzgerald Field House opens on the University of Pittsburgh campus.
 1952
 The Pittsburgh Hornets won their first F. G. "Teddy" Oke Trophy, and their first Calder Cup. 
 Greater Pittsburgh Airport opens.
 Pittsburgh Aviary-Conservatory built.
 1953
 Pittsburgh Photographic Library created.
 Alcoa Building constructed.
 1955 
 Mellon Square laid out.
 The Pittsburgh Hornets win their second F. G. "Teddy" Oke Trophy and Calder Cup.
 Crawford Grill number 3, located on the corner of Bidwell Street and Pennsylvania Avenue, formally closes.
 1956
 January 10: The 3rd AHL All-Star Game is held at the Duquesne Gardens.
 The Pittsburgh Hornets relocate to Rochester, New York, becoming the Rochester Americans.
 Duquesne Gardens is demolished
 1957 
 Grant Street Station opens.
 26th Major League Baseball All-Star Game is played at Forbes Field.
 August 28: Work begins on the Fort Pitt Tunnel
 December 18: Shippingport Atomic Power Station commissioned near city.
 1958 
 WTAE-TV begins broadcasting.
 March 12: Pittsburgh Civic Arena opens
 The Gateway Clipper Fleet begins operations
 1959
 June: WRRK first broadcasts, as WLOA-FM.
 June 19: The Fort Pitt Bridge opens.
 Three Rivers Arts Festival begins.
 Pittsburgh Theological Seminary formed.
 1960
 Point Park College opens
 September 1: Fort Pitt Tunnel opens.
 October 13: Pittsburgh Pirates win 1960 World Series baseball contest.
 Original Hot Dog shop in business.
 1961
 A second incarnation of the Pittsburgh Hornets is established for play in the American Hockey League.
 1962
 May 10:  WDVE first airs, as KQV-FM.
 Winky's restaurant in business.
 The Pittsburgh Jewish Chronicle begins publication.
 1963 
 Eparchy of Pittsburgh of the Ruthenians active.
 1964 
 Port Authority of Allegheny County, Pittsburgh History and Landmarks Foundation, and Pittsburgh Stadium Authority established.
 1965
 March 26: First Roundball Classic is played.
 1966 
 September: Community College of Allegheny County and Glenwood Bridge open.
 October 22: The Pittsburgh Courier ceases publication.
 1967
 On April 30: The Pittsburgh Hornets of the American Hockey League win their final Calder Cup and are soon afterwards disbanded.
 June: Westinghouse Sign entered operation.
 The Pittsburgh Penguins, the city's second team to play in the National Hockey League is formed.
 The Pittsburgh Pipers of the American Basketball Association are formed as a charter franchise for the league.
 Fiesta Theatre opens.
 1968
 The Pittsburgh Pipers win the 1968 American Basketball Association title.
 The Pittsburgh Pipers relocate to Minnesota, becoming the Minnesota Pipers.
 February 19: Locally produced and nationally aired children's program Mister Rogers' Neighborhood premiers.
 1969
 October 17: Fort Duquesne Bridge opens.
 The Pittsburgh Pipers re-locate back to Pittsburgh
 1970
 The Pittsburgh Pipers of the American Basketball Association  are renamed the Pittsburgh Condors.
 Three Rivers Stadium opens.
 U.S. Steel Tower built.
 Population: 540,025.
 1971
 October 17: Pittsburgh Pirates win 1971 World Series baseball contest.
 1972
 June 1972: The American Basketball Association cancels the Pittsburgh Condors franchise.
 The Duquesne Brewing Company is dissolved
 1974
 The Pittsburgh Triangles are established and begin play in World TeamTennis.
 July 23: 45th Major League Baseball All-Star Game is held at Three Rivers Stadium.
 August: Point State Park opens
 1975 
 January 12: Pittsburgh Steelers win Super Bowl IX
 February 1: PATrain Commuter Rail Service Begins.
 The Pittsburgh Triangles win the World TeamTennis Championship
 The Bulletin newspaper founded.
 1976 
 January 18: Pittsburgh Steelers win Super Bowl X
 Dance Alloy troupe formed.
 The Pittsburgh Panthers football team claim their ninth national championship.
 1977
 Pittsburgh Triangles of World TeamTennis formally fold, as the Pennsylvania Keystones.
 Mattress Factory (art gallery) founded.
 Birmingham Bridge and East End Food Co-op open.
 Sri Venkateswara Temple consecrated near city.
 Pittsburgh Three Rivers Regatta begins.
 1979 
 January 21: January 18: Pittsburgh Steelers win Super Bowl XIII
 Pamela's Diner in business.
 The Pittsburgh Colts, a minor league professional football team, is established.
 October 17: Pittsburgh Pirates win 1979 World Series baseball contest.
 1980
 Pittsburgh Community Food Bank opens.
 Population: 423,938.
 1981
 William J. Coyne becomes Pennsylvania's 14th congressional district representative.
 February 7: David L. Lawrence Convention Center built.
 1982
 Three Rivers Film Festival begins.
 Federated Tower built.
 Soar (cognitive architecture) developed at Carnegie Mellon University.
 1983
 March 7: The Pittsburgh Maulers of the United States Football League are founded
March 7: Petromark Industrial Plant Explosion In McKees Rocks (one person dead)
 September 3: The inaugural Pittsburgh Vintage Grand Prix
 Children's Museum of Pittsburgh established.
 One Mellon Center and Oxford Centre built.
 1984
 Pittsburgh Light Rail begins operating.
 PPG Place dedicated.
 Pittsburgh Cultural Trust formed.
 October 26: The Pittsburgh Maulers of the United States Football League fold their operations
 1985 
 Pittsburgh Marathon and Pittsburgh Great Race begin.
 September: Pittsburgh drug trials take place.
 1986 
 Penn Brewery in business.
 April 13: Root Sports Pittsburgh first airs as the Pirates Cable Network and later KBL
 1987 
 June 19: The Pittsburgh Gladiators of the Arena Football League begin play.
 August 1: The city hosts ArenaBowl I, the Pittsburgh Gladiators are defeated in the game, 45–16, by the Denver Dynamite.
 September 25: The Benedum Center is restored.
 Head of the Ohio regatta begins.
 The Veterans Bridge opens.
 1988
 May 6: Mayor Richard Caliguiri dies in office. Sophie Masloff becomes mayor.
 November 11: The A.J. Palumbo Center opens
 1989 
 May 31: The Trib Total Media Amphitheatre first opens as the Melody Amphitheatre.
 Sandcastle Waterpark opens
 Pittsburgh mayoral election
 1990 
 January 21: The 41st National Hockey League All-Star Game is held at the Pittsburgh Civic Arena.
 February 21: The  is transferred as an exhibit for the Carnegie Science Center. 
 Frick's Clayton house museum opens.
 Population: 369,879.
 1991
 Carnegie Science Center opens.
 The Pittsburgh Gladiators relocate to Tampa, Florida, becoming the Tampa Bay Storm.
 May 25: Pittsburgh Penguins win Stanley Cup.
 August 27: The Syria Mosque is demolished
 1992
 Transit strike.
 Newspaper strike.
 May 17: The Pittsburgh Press ceases operations as a print newspaper.
 June 1: Pittsburgh Penguins win their second Stanley Cup.
 The Greensburg Tribune-Review begins circulation into the Pittsburgh metro area, becoming the Pittsburgh Tribune-Review.
 1993 
 Wood Street Galleries open.
 June 1993: Arthur J. Rooney Athletic Field opens
 1994
 April: Final Roundball Classic is played in Pittsburgh.
 The Pittsburgh Phantoms are established a play one season in Roller Hockey International before ceasing operations.
 July 11: Major League Baseball Home Run Derby is held at Three Rivers Stadium.
 July 12: 65th Major League Baseball All-Star Game is held at Three Rivers Stadium.
 The Pittsburgh Piranhas begin play in the Continental Basketball Association
 Andy Warhol Museum opens.
 Thomas J. Murphy, Jr. becomes mayor.
 1995
 The Pittsburgh Piranhas of the Continental Basketball Association folds.
 1996
 January 28: The Dallas Cowboys defeat the Pittsburgh Steelers in Super Bowl XXX.
 Heinz History Center opens.
 Pittsburgh Parks Conservancy organized.
 1997
 June 21: The 1997 NHL Entry Draft is held at the Pittsburgh Civic Arena.
 1998 
 City website online (approximate date).
 Sustainable Pittsburgh established.
 August 6: The Sixth Street Bridge is renamed the Roberto Clemente Bridge.
 Fall: Westinghouse Sign demolished.
 1999
 The Pittsburgh Riverhounds are established
 December: Pitt Stadium is demolished.
 2000 
 UPMC Sports Performance Complex built.
 Population: 334,563.

21st century

 2001
 February 11: Three Rivers Stadium is demolished
 March 31: PNC Park opens.
 August 18: Heinz Field opens.
 August 31: Final episode of locally produced and nationally aired children's program, Mister Rogers' Neighborhood airs.
 November 6: Pittsburgh mayoral election, 2001 held.
 2002 
 SouthSide Works opens.
 Crawford Grill number 2, located on the corner of Wylie Avenue and Elmore Street, formally closes.
 July 11: Homestead High-Level Bridge was renamed the Homestead Grays Bridge. 
 The Pittsburgh Passion, which is part of the Women's Football Alliance, is founded.
 2003 
 Tekkoshocon anime convention begins.
 2004 
 Pittsburgh Intergovernmental Cooperation Authority formed.
 2005
 March 18: The Seventh Street Bridge is renamed the Andy Warhol Bridge.
 I Heart PGH blog begins publication.
 September 17: Joe Walton Stadium opens
 November 8: Pittsburgh mayoral election, 2005 held.
 2006
 February 6: The Pittsburgh Steelers win Super Bowl XL.
 April 22: The Ninth Street Bridge is renamed the Rachel Carson Bridge.
 July 9: All-Star Futures Game and the Taco Bell All-Star Legends and Celebrity Softball Game are played at PNC Park.
 July 10: 2006 Major League Baseball Home Run Derby held at PNC Park
 July 11: 77th Major League Baseball All-Star Game is held at PNC Park.
 Carnegie Mellon University's Remaking Cities Institute established.
 Bob O'Connor becomes mayor, succeeded by Luke Ravenstahl.
 Anthrocon furry convention relocates to Pittsburgh.
 2007 
 November 6: Pittsburgh mayoral special election, 2007 held.
 2008
 January 1: Pittsburgh Penguins win the first-ever NHL Winter Classic.
 June 6: The Stanley Cup is first awarded in the city, at Mellon Arena, as the Detroit Red Wings defeat the Pittsburgh Penguins in the Stanley Cup Finals, 4 games to 2.
 Duquesne Brewing Company is resurrected
 Pittsburgh Riverhounds, a professional soccer team, begins play as a member of the USL's A-League
 2009
 February 1: Pittsburgh Steelers win Super Bowl XLIII football contest.
 April 4: 2009 shooting of Pittsburgh police officers.
 April 11: Tea Party demonstration.
 June 12: The Pittsburgh Penguins win their third Stanley Cup.
 July: Iron City Brewing Company relocates most of its operations to Latrobe, Pennsylvania.
 August 9: The Rivers Casino opens.
 September: G-20 Summit on Financial Markets and the World Economy held.
 HackPittsburgh workshop founded.
 2010
 Bakery Square development and Consol Energy Center (arena) opens.
 December: Stage AE opens
 Population: 307,484.
 2011
 January 1: The 2011 Winter Classic is held at Heinz Field.
 February 6: The Green Bay Packers defeat the Pittsburgh Steelers, 31–25, in Super Bowl XLV.
 Pittsburgh Power of the Arena Football League is established.
 September 26: Pittsburgh Civic Arena is demolished.
 November 14: The Pittsburgh Press is resurrected as an online newspaper by Block Communications.
 2012
 Wigle Whiskey distillery in business.
 March 23: North Shore Connector opens.
 June 22–23: The 2012 NHL Entry Draft is held at the Consol Energy Center. 
 December 27–28: First Three Rivers Classic is played.
 2013 
 April 11–13: The 2013 Men's Frozen Four is held at Consol Energy Center.
 April 13: Highmark Stadium opens
 November 5: Pittsburgh mayoral election, 2013 held.
 2014
 January 6: Bill Peduto becomes mayor, succeeding Luke Ravenstahl.
 November 17: The Pittsburgh Power of the Arena Football League folds.
 2016
 June 12: The Pittsburgh Penguins win their fourth Stanley Cup.
 2017 
 February 25: The 2017 NHL Stadium Series (sport event) is held at Heinz Field.
 June 11: The Pittsburgh Penguins win their fifth Stanley Cup.
 2018
 October 27: Pittsburgh synagogue shooting
 2022
 January 3: Ed Gainey becomes mayor, the first African-American to be elected to the office
 January 28: The Fern Hollow Bridge in Frick Park collapses, with some minor injuries but no fatalities, ahead of a visit by President Joseph Biden, who visits the site and pledges to repair any of the nation's bridges needing renovation.

See also
 History of Pittsburgh
 List of mayors of Pittsburgh
 List of City of Pittsburgh historic designations
Timeline of women's suffrage in Pennsylvania

other cities in Pennsylvania
 Timeline of Philadelphia

References

Bibliography

Published in the 19th century

1800s-1840s
 
 
 
 
 
 
 
 1847 ed.

1850s-1890s

Published in the 20th century

1900s-1940s
 
 
 
 
 
 
 
 
 
 
 
 
 
 
 
 
 
 
 
 
 
 
 
 v.2

1950s-1990s
 Lubove, Roy, ed.  Pittsburgh 1976. 294 pp. short excerpts covering main themes

Published in the 21st century
 
  (series of articles about Pittsburgh), 2014-

External links

 
 Items related to Pittsburgh, various dates (via Digital Public Library of America)
 
  (fulltext, various dates)
 
 

Years in Pennsylvania
 
Pittsburgh
Pittsburgh